Forced labor in California existed as a system technically different but similar to chattel slavery. While California's state constitution outlawed slavery, the 1850 Act for the Government and Protection of Indians allowed the indenture of Native Californians. The act allowed for a system of custodianship for indigenous children and a system of convict leasing. These systems were backed by the legalized corporal punishment of any Native Californian, and the stripping of many legal rights of Native Californians.

Background

Spanish California 

Pre-European contact, the population of native Californian Indians estimates vary, ranging from 300,000 to  nearly one million. In 1542, Spanish explorer Juan Rodriguez Cabrillo first landed in California, but the region wasn't successfully settled by the Spanish until 1769. In 1769, Padre Junípero Serra founded the first Spanish mission in California, el Misión San Diego de Alcalá. The padres would often baptize Native Californian villages and relocate them to the missions, where they would work either voluntarily or by force from location to location. There, Native Californians became cobblers, carpenters, masons, planters, harvesters, and cattle slaughterers. To the padres, the Native Californians were newly baptized members of the Catholic Church and were treated with varying amounts of respect, depending on the priest in question. Reportedly, some of the missions planned on handing the missions over to the Native Americans after ten years. However, this never occurred.

Many of the soldiers, however, saw them solely as manpower to be exploited. The soldiers would force the Native Californians to perform most of the manual labor needed in their fortresses, and would hunt down any natives who tried to escape. These four military installations, primarily in place to reinforce Spanish claims to Alta California, were known as el Presidio Real de San Carlos de Monterey, el Presidio Real de San Diego, el Presidio Real de San Francisco, and el Presidio Real de Santa Bárbara. The soldiers would often rape the native women of the villages.

There were several recorded uprisings of Indians resisting Spanish rule, one of the earliest being the attack on the Mission San Diego de Alcala on November 4, 1775. The Tipai-Ipai organized nine villages into a force of around 800 people to destroy the mission and kill three of the Spanish, one of them being Padre Luis Jayme. However, not every uprising was violent. In September 1795, over two hundred natives, including many old neophytes, simply deserted San Francisco all in different directions. When uprisings occurred, the natives did not go unpunished: some Indians were put to death. The padres treated Indians and Native Americans as slaves.

Mexican California 

From 1821 to 1846, after Mexico gained its independence from Spain, California was under Mexican rule. In 1824, the Mexican constitution guaranteed citizenship to all persons, providing natives with the right to continue occupying their villages. Additionally, the Mexican National Congress passed the Colonization Act of 1824 which granted large sections of unoccupied land to individuals. This act enforced a class division in which Native Americans were treated like slaves because the native Californians became the labor force for these ranchos.  In 1833, the government secularized missions, saying that the missions needed to give their land to catholic Indians. Instead of doing that, however, many civil authorities confiscated most of the land for themselves. Californios often gained prominence by conducting military attacks on indigenous settlements. By 1846, Mexico's Assembly had passed resolutions calling for funds to locate and destroy Indian villages.

While they had more rights than they had under Spanish rule, the native population still was the labor force for ranchos or in developing towns. Essentially, the entire economy shifted from work on the missions to work on large land estates of wealthy Mexicans.

History

Settlement of California

American settlers had begun flooding California from the 1820s and, following a brief period of independence, California was officially acquired by the United States in 1848, bringing in more American immigrants due to the gold rush. Although the indigenous population of California under Spanish rule dropped from 300,000 prior to 1769, to 250,000 in 1834, this was primarily due to contact with Old World diseases and assimilation. After gaining independence from Spain in 1821 and the secularization of the coastal missions by the Mexican government in 1834, the indigenous population suffered a much more drastic decrease in population. Indeed, the period immediately following the U.S. conquest of California has been characterized by numerous sources as a genocide. Under US sovereignty, after 1848, the Indian population plunged from perhaps 150,000 to 30,000 in 1870 and reached a low of 16,000 in 1900.

California Genocide

The American settlers came in with an initial dislike of the Native Americans, hating and fearing them for no historical reason. The confrontation between Americans and Indians was often brutal, resulting in the murder, burn and rape of native Californians; kidnapping and selling of women and children into slavery was also commonly practiced. In those 10 years the Indian population of the Central Valley and adjacent hills and mountains decreased from around 150,000 to 50,000. Many hostile interactions began to occur such as the Clear Lake Massacre of 1849. At the Clear Lake Massacre, local Pomo killed two white men who had been exploiting local Indians, enslaving them and abusing them and sexually assaulting Indian women. As a result, the whites created a massive military campaign of savagery and brutality.

On the April 22, 1850, to "craft its own code of compulsory labor", an "Act for the Government and Protection of Indians" was passed which legally curtailed rights of Indians.

Between 1851 and 1852, the federal government appointed three Indian commissioners - Redick McKee, George W. Barbour, and O. M. Wozencraft - to negotiate treaties with the California Indians because Native American tribes were recognized as foreign nations, making treaties the legal form of negotiation. The commissioners knew nothing about the California Indians or their cultures, making the process very difficult. Eventually, 18 treaties were drafted, allocating 7.5% of the state of California to Indians in reservations, but forcing them to give up the rest of their land. In June 1852, however, all of the treaties were rejected by the Senate and then put into secret files; they were not to be seen again until 1905. Military campaigns against these Indians often led to the indiscriminate murders of Indians; their goals were to essentially exterminate the Indians. Monetary rewards were often offered for the heads and scalps of Indian people. On December 30, 1849 the Kawaiisu Tribe of Tejon of California signed a Treaty with the United States at Aboqui, New Mexico, it was Ratified on September 9, 1850 and signed by the President on September 9, 1850. It is called the Treaty with the Utahs, Treaty #256 (9, Stat. 984).

There were many whites who did deeply lament the "oppression" that was placed upon the Indians. In 1860, the Act was amended to allow any Indians who were not already indentured to be kidnapped under the guise of apprenticeship. Also in 1860, an army officer at Fort Humboldt observed "cold-blooded Indian killing being considered honorable, shooting Indians and murdering even squaws and children that have been domesticated for months and years, without a moment's warning and with as little compunction as they would rid themselves of a dog." On February 16, the Indian Island Massacre occurred when the newly created Humboldt Volunteer Militia paddled to Indian Island where the Wiyot men and women slept after a week of ceremonial dancing. With hatchets, clubs and knives, the militia killed 80-100 Wiyot men and women. Two other raids occurred that night, causing 200-600 Wiyot casualties.

In an 1867 analysis done for the Secretary of War, it was noted that the rapid advancement of white settlements had greatly limited the sources of fish, wild fowl, game, nuts and roots. At that point, the Indians were forced into collisions with the whites and often needed to choose between stealing or starvation. By 1870, the population had declined from 40,000 at the time of the United States acquisition of California to 20,000. Thousands of Indians had been murdered, raped or sold into slavery. Later in 1900, the Native American population in California was reported to be around 16,000.

Abolition

During the American Civil War various political factions in opposition to slavery and other forms of forced labor united as the Union Party and began to slowly dismantle forced labor systems in California. Republicans had decried the kidnapping and forced apprenticeship of Native Americans but still viewed the arrests and leasing of Native Americans as a necessary evil to civilize them.

In April 1863, after the declaration of the Emancipation Proclamation, the California legislature abolished all forms of legal indenture and apprenticeship for Native Americans. Illegal slave raiding and holding continued afterwards but died out around 1870. The end came due to the increase in European and Chinese immigrants that served as cheap laborers, and the massive reduction of California's indigenous population.

Labor system

Illegal practices
In general, Californians interpreted these 1850 laws in a way that all Indians could face indentured servitude through arrests and "hiring out". Once the Indians had entered into this servitude, the term limit was often ignored, thus resulting in slavery; this was what Californians used to "satisfy the states high demand for domestic servants and agricultural laborers". Kidnapping raids became common place, these raids were done to acquire indigenous people that settlers could press into servitude. Although technically an illegal practice, law enforcement rarely intervened. The well-being of those in forced labor was often easily disregarded since laborers could be acquired for prices as cheap as 35 dollars.

Acting Governor Richard B. Mason reported that, "over half the miners in California were Indians". The enforcement of the Act of 1850 was left with the local justices of peace, meaning they became crucial links in all interracial interactions. Many justices took advantage of the vague language and the power bestowed upon them to continue the kidnapping of Indian children through 1860.

An illegal trade of kidnapped slaves existed and was rarely stopped, it was only policed after the abolition of the forced labor systems.

Laws
The Act for the Government and Protection of Indians was passed in California in 1850,
It provided that:
 "White persons or proprietors could apply to the Justice of Peace for the removal of Indians from lands in the white person's possession"
 "Any person could go before a Justice of Peace to obtain Indian children for indenture. The Justice determined whether or not compulsory means were used to obtain the child. If the Justice was satisfied that no coercion occurred, the person obtain a certificate that authorized him to have the care, custody, control and earnings of an Indian until their age of majority (for males, eighteen years, for females, fifteen years)." In actual practice this section lead to a trade system of kidnapped Indian children, either stolen from their parents or taken from the results of militia attacks during the 1850s and 1860s. Frontier whites often eagerly paid $50–$100 for Indian children to apprentice and so groups of kidnappers would often raid isolated Indian villages, snatching up children in the chaos of battle.
 "If a convicted Indian was punished by paying a fine, any white person, with the consent of the Justice, could give bond for the Indian's fine and costs. In return, the Indian was "compelled to work until his fine was discharged or cancelled." The person bailing was supposed to "treat the Indian humanely, and clothe and feed him properly." The Court decided "the allowance given for such labor."" Local authorities were often required to hire out the "convicts" within the next 24 hours to the highest bidder essentially creating a system of selling slaves out of jail.
 Indians could not testify for or against whites. It was illegal to sell or administer alcohol to Indians and if Indians were convicted of stealing any valuable or livestock, they could receive any number of lashes (as long as it was less than 25) and a fine of up to $200.

Labor roles
Not many surviving documents exist for historians to analyze how prevalent and how California's forced labor system worked, however various estimates have been made of the surviving accounts and documents. The Gold Rush brought many American migrants to California, this population increase required an increase in food production. Many bound laborers are thought to have been used in California's new agricultural economy. A majority of the laborers leased were Native women and children, who were leased in response to California's population shortage of white women and children, many would serve as domestic workers.

See also
 Convict leasing
 Peonage

References

Bibliography 

History of slavery in California
Native American history of California
Labor relations in California
Slavery of Native Americans
California genocide
Native American genocide
Unfree labor in the United States
Imprisonment and detention in the United States
Penal labor in the United States
Race legislation in the United States
Reconstruction Era